The Autopista AP-4 (also called Autopista del Sur) is a Spanish autopista route which starts in Seville and ends in Cádiz. It has a total length of 123.80 km.

External links
Autopista AP-4 Concessionaire

AP-4
AP-4